Andrea Nuyt (born 10 July 1974) is a retired speed skater from the Netherlands who won a silver medal at the World Sprint Speed Skating Championships for Women in 2002. She also competed at the 1998 and 2002 Winter Olympics in the 500 m and 1000 m. Her best achievement was fourth place in the 500 m in 2002. 

Nuyt has two daughters, Lisan and Manouk, with her partner Carl Verheijen, who is also an Olympic speed skater.

Personal records

Tournament overview

Source:

References

1974 births
Living people
Dutch female speed skaters
Olympic speed skaters of the Netherlands
Speed skaters at the 1998 Winter Olympics
Speed skaters at the 2002 Winter Olympics
Sportspeople from Gouda, South Holland
21st-century Dutch women
20th-century Dutch women